Bishop Mar Shlemon Warduni (born April 24, 1943) is Auxiliary Bishop of the Patriarchate of Babylon, Iraq, of the Chaldean Catholic Church. In 2003 he was the Locum tenens of the Patriarch of Babylon of the Chaldeans.

Life
Shlemon Warduni was born at Batnaya, Iraq on April 24, 1943, and was ordained priest on June 29, 1968. On January 12, 2001, he was appointed Auxiliary Bishop of the Patriarchate of Babylon and he was consecrated bishop on February 16, 2001, by Patriarch Mar Raphael I Bidawid.

After the death of Patriarch Mar Raphael I Bidawid, he was appointed Locum tenens of the Patriarch of Babylon of the Chaldeans till the election, on December 3, 2003, of Patriarch Mar Emmanuel III Delly.

External links

2006 Interview about the tragic situation of Christians in Iraq

1943 births
Iraqi Assyrian people
Living people
Chaldean bishops
Iraqi Eastern Catholics
People from Nineveh Governorate